A Medicare card is a plastic card, the same size as a typical credit card, issued to Australian citizens and permanent residents and their families. The card or the Medicare number is required to be provided to enable the cardholder to receive a rebate of medical expenses under Australia's Medicare system, as well as subsidised medications under the Pharmaceutical Benefits Scheme (PBS). The card is usually green in colour, although interim cards are light blue and cards for Reciprocal Health Care Agreement visitors are light yellow. The cards are issued by a government agency called Medicare Australia.

All permanent residents of Australia are entitled to a Medicare card, except for those who are deemed to be not residing in Australia. Citizenship is not necessary to be eligible for a Medicare card. The card lists an individual as well as any members of his or her family he or she chooses to add who are also permanent residents and meet the Medicare definition of dependent. The card must be produced or the Medicare number provided if the Medicare rebate is paid directly to the doctor under the bulk billing system. The doctor can retain the Medicare number for use when the patient returns for another consultation. It is also necessary to provide a Medicare number (although not necessarily show the card) to gain access to the public hospital system to be treated at no cost as a public patient. For non-elective treatment (e.g. emergency), public hospitals will admit patients without a number or card and resolve Medicare eligibility issues after treatment.

Use of the card
Medicare Australia supplies Medicare cards and numbers. Almost every eligible person has a card: in June 2002 there were 20.4 million Medicare cardholders, and the Australian population was less than 20 million at the time (overseas Australian cardholders may still have a card).

The use of the card is relevant only to consultations with medical practitioners who have been issued with a Medicare provider number. Such access has been made subject to increasing requirements since the mid-1990s. The Medicare card is used for health care purposes only and cannot be used to track in a database a number of activities. It contains a name and number, and no visible photograph. Individuals are not legally required to have a Medicare card, to carry it with them, or to produce it on request.

The primary purpose of the Medicare card is to prove eligibility when seeking Australian Medicare-subsidised care from a medical practitioner or hospital. Legally, the card need not be produced and a Medicare number is sufficient.

Since 2002, a Medicare card has been required to be shown at a pharmacy when collecting Pharmaceutical Benefits Scheme (PBS) medications. The pharmacy can retain the number for use when the cardholder returns with another prescription.

The Medicare card is used as a recognised form of ID in opening bank accounts or obtaining a driver's license. On the ‘100 point scale’, on which 100 points of ID are required for proof of identity, a Medicare card generally counts for 30 points.

The Medicare card will also be required when accessing medical, hospital or pharmaceutical services in a country with which Australia has a reciprocal health care agreement.

Rebates
The Medicare scheme entitles most Australian residents to a rebate of medical and some other expenses paid for consultations with a medical practitioner who holds a current Medicare provider number. The medical practitioner will usually apply for, maintain and quote a provider number on their tax invoices. Without quoting a valid provider number, a practitioner's patients will not be entitled to a rebate of their medical expenses.

A practitioner who is in breach of a contract with the Commonwealth may face a 12-year prohibition on access to a provider number. This means that a Medicare cardholder cannot obtain a rebate of expenses paid to a prohibited practitioner regardless of the practitioner's registration at any (state) board or specialty for the period that the practitioner is without a provider number.

Issue of Medicare cards
Medicare cards are issued by Medicare Australia (until late 2005 known as the Health Insurance Commission or HIC) to individuals and their families. A maximum of five names can be included on a card. Families with more than five members will have additional names listed on additional cards, while retaining the same card number. Children are listed on their parent's card – a family may be all on one card, or a child may be listed on one parent's card, or both parents' cards, or even in some cases, alone on their own card if their name exceeds a specific number of letters. Children who are wards of the state will be listed on a card with the Department of Children's Services as cardholder. Medicare cards may be used to show a relationship when parents have different surnames to their children.

Individual Medicare cards are generally only issued to people over 15. This is a Medicare Australia policy (not legislation) and there are exceptions for people at boarding schools or away from home. Significantly, this policy may detract from the right of a mature minor to gain confidential medical care. Using their family's Medicare card (and presenting the card) could potentially notify their parents of the consultation, but only if the parents request information about their child's medical claims and for a person to request information about medical claims for people 14 years and over they must have the permission of that person they are requesting the information for.

Proposed Australia and Access Cards
Several unsuccessful proposals have been made to expand the scope of use of the Medicare card, such as the an Australia Card proposal. 

In 2005, plans to expand the functions of the Medicare card were announced by then Howard Government Human Services Minister Joe Hockey. The new card, to be called the Access Card, was intended to replace both the Medicare and up to 17 other similar cards (such as Centrelink benefit and concession cards), and to commence operation in 2008. However, the scheme was criticised by some sectors of the public and relevant interest groups as a step in the same direction of an Australia Card. The Howard government was unable to implement the scheme before the government's electoral defeat in 2007.

The incoming Labor Government announced on 7 December 2007 that the Access Card scheme would be abandoned. The same aims were later achieved with myGov from 2013.

See also
 Medical Rural Bonded Scheme

References

Medicare Australia
Identity documents of Australia
Health insurance cards